The Philadelphia Folk Festival is a folk music festival held annually at Old Pool Farm in Upper Salford, Pennsylvania, just outside of Philadelphia.

The four-night, three-day festival, which is produced and run by the non-profit Philadelphia Folksong Society and staffed almost entirely by volunteers.

The event hosts contemporary and traditional artists in genres under the umbrella of Folk, including World/Fusion, Celtic, Singer/Songwriter, Folk Rock, Country, Klezmer, Blues, Bluegrass, Hip/Hop, Spoken Word, Storytelling, and Dance.

Gene Shay and folklorist Kenneth S. Goldstein founded the festival, along with George Britton, Bob Seigel, David Baskin, Esther Halpern, and others. Shay has acted as Master of Ceremonies since its inception and Goldstein served as Program Director for the first 15 years.

Originally held on Wilson Farm in Paoli, Pennsylvania, each year the event hosts over 35,000 visitors and nearly 7,000 campers at the Old Pool Farm. The event presents over 75 hours of music with local, regional, and national talent on its stages. A special Camp Stage show takes place on Thursday night, hosted by WXPN radio for the nationally syndicated World Cafe with David Dye.

The Philadelphia Folksong Society presents the Philadelphia Folk Festival and has a full-time, year-round staff. The current PFS Executive Director is Justin Nordell since 2007, while past E.D.s include Lauri Barish and Levi Landis.

This festival went online in 2020 and 2021, raising over $200,000 to support artists out of work, as live concerts were cancelled caused by the COVID-19 pandemic. The Festival will return as a hybrid event live and in person for 2022.

See also

 Newport Folk Festival

References

Folk festivals in the United States
Music festivals in Philadelphia
1962 establishments in Pennsylvania
Music festivals established in 1962